Xi Chen (Chinese: 陈汐) is a computer scientist. He is an associate professor of computer science at Columbia University. Chen won the 2021 Gödel Prize and Fulkerson Prize for his co-authored paper "Complexity of Counting CSP with Complex Weights" with Jin-Yi Cai.

Biography 
Chen received his B.S. and Ph.D. from Tsinghua University. He was a postdoctoral fellow at Institute for Advanced Study, Princeton University, University of Southern California, and joined the Columbia faculty in 2011.

Chen's research focuses on computational complexity theory. He also received a Presburger Award from the European Association for Theoretical Computer Science in 2015 and a Sloan Research Fellowship in 2012.

References 

Living people
Tsinghua University alumni
Chinese computer scientists
Columbia School of Engineering and Applied Science faculty
Year of birth missing (living people)
Fellows of the American Physical Society